This is the complete list of Asian Games medalists in fencing from 1974 to 2018.

Men

Individual épée

Team épée

Individual foil

Team foil

Individual sabre

Team sabre

Women

Individual épée

Team épée

Individual foil

Team foil

Individual sabre

Team sabre

References 

Medalists from previous Asian Games – Men – Individual
Medalists from previous Asian Games – Men – Team
Medalists from previous Asian Games – Women – Individual
Medalists from previous Asian Games – Women – Team

External links 
 Asian Fencing Federation

Fencing
medalists